Daniel Keith Happe is an English professional footballer who plays as a defender for  club Leyton Orient.

Career
On 13 January 2017, Happe joined Southern League Division One Central club Histon on loan and appeared as a last minute substitute in the 3–2 win at Uxbridge the following day. He also appeared as a substitute in the 2–1 win at Kidlington on 28 January.

Happe was drafted into the Leyton Orient first team squad in February 2017, and made his debut and his first senior start in the 3–0 league defeat at Cambridge United on 8 April 2017.

He signed his first professional contract in October 2017, tying him to Leyton Orient until the end of the 2019–20 season. He signed a new contract in July 2019, until 2021.

Career statistics

Honours

Club
Leyton Orient
National League: 2018–19
FA Trophy runner-up: 2018–19

References

External links
Daniel Happe at Soccerbase

Living people
1998 births
Footballers from the London Borough of Tower Hamlets
Association football defenders
Leyton Orient F.C. players
Histon F.C. players
English footballers
English Football League players
National League (English football) players
Southern Football League players